Psonic Psunspot is the second album by English rock band the Dukes of Stratosphear, released in 1987. Also counted as XTC's tenth studio album, it is a follow-up to 25 O'Clock (1985).

In 2002, the website Pitchfork listed the album at 66 on their "Top 100 Albums of the 1980s", calling the songs "a surreal rock-opera of opaque, hallucinogenic wonder".

Music
Some of its tracks were rejected XTC songs ("Shiny Cage", "Little Lighthouse", and "You're My Drug"). Like the previous album 25 O'Clock, this album is inspired by 1960s psychedelia.

Release
The album was released in its original form on vinyl and cassette, accompanied with the "You're A Good Man Albert Brown" single and the promotional-only "Vanishing Girl" single.  A simultaneous CD release entitled Chips from the Chocolate Fireball incorporated all of the tracks from 25 O'Clock and Psonic Psunspot with different packaging. Later, a remastered and expanded version of Psonic Psunspot was released on 20 April 2009 by Andy Partridge's Ape House record label. This edition is credited to "XTC as The Dukes of Stratosphear".

Track listing
All songs written and composed by Andy Partridge, except where noted.

Also includes the promotional video for "You're a Good Man Albert Brown (Curse You Red Barrel)" as a QuickTime file.

Personnel
 Sir John Johns – vocals, guitar, bass on "Vanishing Girl", drums on "Pale and Precious"
 The Red Curtain – electric bass, vocals, rhythm guitar on "Vanishing Girl"
 Lord Cornelius Plum – mellotron, piano, organ, fuzz-tone guitar
 E.I.E.I. Owen – drums on all tracks except "Pale and Precious"
 Lily Fraser – narration
 Produced by John Leckie and The Dukes

References

1987 albums
Albums produced by John Leckie
Virgin Records albums
The Dukes of Stratosphear albums